Saint-Georges-de-Luzençon is a commune in the Aveyron department in southern France. The commune was part of the Rouergue province, where people communicated with a variation of the Occitan language, Rouergat.

Population

Its inhabitants are called Saint-Georgiens.

Geography
The territory of the commune is a part of the South Massif Central. The village itself is nestled in the Cernon valley along the D992 road. The hearth of the village is composed of stonework basements following the forms of the Middle Ages fortress. The main avenue, lately built, welcomes the totality of the commerces. Finally, most of the village surface is occupied by little houses grouped in lots, on a typical contemporary style. In spite of the fact that the village is distant of a dozen kilometers from the nearby city of Millau, it continues to welcome families by reason of its intermediate position with Millau, Saint Affrique and the Roquefort cheese factories in Roquefort-sur-Soulzon.

History
Old settlement : Dolmens, fragments of pottery from the 4th century, barbarian cemetery in Briadels.
Territory exchanged between the Rodez bishop and the Toulouse count, devastated by the Protestants of Las Ribes in the 16th century, and the ones of the Rohan duke in the 17th.

See also
Communes of the Aveyron department

References

Communes of Aveyron
Aveyron communes articles needing translation from French Wikipedia